Jamaah Ansharusy Syariah (literally Community of the Helpers of Sharia, JAS) is an Islamist organization split from Jamaah Ansharut Tauhid (literally Community of the Helpers of Tawhid, JAT). The organization described as splinter group of JAT, after Abu Bakar Ba’asyir expelled his sons and top aides from JAT following their refusal to support his pledge of support to the Islamic State (IS). JAS objective is the rival of JAT recruitment for followers in support of the full implementation of Sharia in Indonesia. JAS claimed a membership of 2,000 in Jakarta, West Java, Central Java, East Java, West Nusa Tenggara, and Bengkulu.

Formation 
The organization formed created in 2014 following Ba'asyir's pledge of loyalty to ISIS. The majority of the JAT leadership objected not only to Ba’asyir’s decision but also to his failure to consult with them before taking such a step. Baasyir also requested anybody who not followed his pledge to ISIS should leave JAT. Muhammad Achwan, the acting JAT head during Ba’asyir’s incarceration, along with two of Ba’asyir’s sons, Abdul Rahim and Abdul Roshid, led a mass resignation from JAT and the setting up of JAS.

Activities 
Unlike the former JAT, JAS, although holding the Salafi puritan view of Islam, they do not follow JAT extreme ways of Islamic terrorism. JAS also rejected ISIS proposed caliphate, claiming that ISIS way is far from the original Islamic concept. JAS, however, advocating the way of "Jihadocracy", using democratic tools for Jihad purposes and "Jihad Konstitusional" approach. "Jihad Konstitutional" is an Indonesian Islamist paradigm to promote and support Islamic right-wing politicians or sympathized politicians that supported the idea of implementation of Sharia in Indonesia in hope that installed politicians will change the laws to become more favorable for the Islamists and their agendas. During 2019 Indonesian general election, JAS, along with other Islamic right-wing organizations and groups supported figures and candidates that perceived to be more accommodating towards the formalisation of sharia law, either by employing religious sermons and gathering to promote politicians that supported them.

The organization also maintained presence in internet, with website, Facebook page, Youtube, and Instagram account relatively active. Unlike JAT, JAS actively active in public engagements and solidarity acts under the aegis of their Yanmas Division.

The organization also set Muhammad Rizieq Shihab as their patron, despite Rizieq not connected with the organization. When Rizieq sentenced and imprisoned by the authorities, they released press release contained condemnation to Indonesia' justice system and the government by extension for being "unfair and unjust" and "not sided with Islam."

Alleged terrorism activities 
Despite JAS away from Islamic terrorism, some alleged terrorism acts by JAS member also reported.

On 24 September 2020, Gunawan, deradicalized former JAS figure in West Nusa Tenggara reported returned to Indonesia side and leaving JAS. He acknowledged that during his time with JAS, he become the Leader of JAS' paramilitary and taught "warfare courses" including bombmaking in JAS. He later surrendered his paramilitary attire to the Head of National Counter Terrorism Agency at that time, Police Commissioner General Boy Rafli Amar which visiting Penatoi, Bima, at that time as sign of his surrender and return to Indonesia.

On 3 February 2021, a British muslimah captured during an immigration operation conducted by the Directorate General of Immigration. At the time of her capture, she was charged by the authorities for overstaying. However, the later investigation revealed that she is listed as "dangerous person" and "individual suspected as terrorist" based on Indonesia National Police's List of Suspected Terrorists and Terrorist Organizations (Indonesian: Daftar Terduga Teroris dan Organisasi Teroris). She accused as terrorist financer and founding a front organization for funding Al-Nusra Front, and later Tahrir al-Sham in Indonesia. She was joined JAS for some time.

Anti-Christianism Campaign 
JAS promoted anti-christianism. On 25 December 2022, JAS openly started an illegal anti-christianism campaign in Surabaya, cited an excerpt of Indonesian Ulema Council fatwa. Their action was disbanded by the Police.

Status 
Indonesian National Counter Terrorism Agency listed JAS as suspected terrorist group, citing there is no significant difference between JAS and JAT. The agency also added the organization under their surveillance. Their status as surveilled organization also reconfirmed in 2018.

References 

Far-right politics in Asia
Islamist groups
Islamic organizations based in Indonesia
Islamism in Indonesia
Islamism